SolarPACES (Solar Power and Chemical Energy Systems) is an international cooperative network bringing together teams of national experts from around the world to focus on the development and marketing of Concentrating Solar Power (CSP) systems (also known as solar thermal power systems). 

Founded in 1977, SolarPACES is a collaborative program of the International Energy Agency.

Tasks

Programs are carried out under the framework of an Implementing Agreement, signed by contracting parties to the agreement - these include government agencies and government-designated entities of the countries involved. Implementing Agreements offer the framework for collaborative research projects. 

Within SolarPACES, individual research, development and demonstration projects are organised within related Tasks. There are six tasks currently being undertaken by the SolarPACES Program:

Task I: Solar Thermal Electric Systems

Task II: Solar Chemistry Research

The primary objective of Task II – Solar Chemistry R&D – is to develop and optimize solar-driven thermochemical processes and to demonstrate their technical and economic feasibility at an industrial scale:

1. Production of energy carriers: conversion of solar energy into chemical fuels that can be stored longterm and transported long-range. During this term, special focus is on solar thermal production of hydrogen and syngas.

2. Processing of chemical commodities: use of solar energy for processing energy-intensive, high-temperature materials.

3. Detoxification and recycling of waste materials: use of solar energy for detoxification and recycling of hazardous waste and of secondary raw materials.

Task III: Solar Technology and Advanced Applications

Task IV: SHIP - Solar Heat for Industrial Processes

Solar Heat Integration in Industrial Processes is a collaborative project of the IEA's Solar Heating and Cooling, Task 49, and SolarPACES Program. The purpose of the project is to provide the knowledge and technology necessary to foster installation of solar thermal plants for industrial process heat. To do this, studies on the technology's potential are conducted in the participating countries, medium temperature collectors were developed for the production of process heat up to temperature levels of 250 °C, and solutions to the problems involved in integrating solar heat into industrial processes were sought. In addition, demonstration projects were carried out in cooperation with the solar industry.

Task V: Solar Resource Assessment and Forecasting

“Solar Resource Assessment and Forecasting” is a  follow up of the earlier SHC-Task-36 named “Solar Resource Knowledge Management”.  

The task now focuses primarily on the two most important topics in the field of solar radiation for solar energy applications: For financing the bigger and bigger projects sound solar resource assessments are more and more important. And for operation of the many MW installed power forecasting of solar radiation is receiving high attention from plant and grid operators. In SolarPACES it remains as Task V, but with a new title.

It covers satellite-derived solar resource products, ground-based solar measurements also covering topics not picked up in Task 36 like measuring circumsolar radiation. The Task equally supports solar thermal heating and cooling, photovoltaics and concentrating solar power applications. However, for best serving the objectives of SolarPACES this report focuses on direct solar radiation, which can be concentrated. The four objectives of this Task are:

• Evaluate solar resource variability that impacts large penetrations of solar technologies

• Develop standardized and integrating procedures for data bankability

• Improve procedures for short-term solar resource forecasting

• Advance solar resource modelling procedures based on physical principles

Task VI: Solar Energy and Water Processes and Applications

See also
List of solar thermal power stations
REN21
International Renewable Energy Agency
International Energy Agency

External links
SolarPACES official site
Concentrating Solar Power Projects

Solar energy companies